Kaavalmaadam is a 1980 Indian Malayalam film, directed by P. Chandrakumar. The film stars Jose, Ambika, K. P. Ummer and Kuthiravattam Pappu in the lead roles. The film has musical score by A. T. Ummer.

Cast
 
Jose as Ramu
Ambika as Malli
K. P. Ummer as Kollapanikker
Kuthiravattam Pappu as Kunjali
Mala Aravindan  as Rappai 
Sukumaran as Rajasekharan Thampi
Sukumari as Pathumma
Praveena as Kurathi Valli
Suchithra (old) as Raji
 Sathyachitra as valli

Soundtrack
The music was composed by A. T. Ummer and the lyrics were written by Sathyan Anthikkad.

References

External links
 
https://www.youtube.com/watch?v=FkWG-H-_h3Y

1980 films
1980s Malayalam-language films
Films directed by P. Chandrakumar